Drôme  can mean:

 Drôme, a department of south east France
 Drôme (river), a left tributary of the Rhône which gave its name to the department
 Drôme (Aure), a smaller left tributary of the Aure in northern France